Karl Fuchs may refer to:

 Karl Fuchs (museum founder), founder of the Kazan Zoo in 1806 and the Botanical Museum in Kazan
 Karl Fuchs (politician) (1920–1989), German politician, representative of the Christian Social Union of Bavaria